Niederzier is a municipality in the district of Düren in the state of North Rhine-Westphalia, Germany. It is located approximately 10 km north of Düren, and 10 km south-east of Jülich.

Personalities 

 Viktor Schroeder (1922-2011), industrialist, patron and honorary citizen
 Karl Lauterbach (born 1963), doctor and politician (SPD), since 2005 Bundestag deputy 
 Andrea Tillmanns (born 1972), author

References

External links

Düren (district)